Raúl Tettamanti (born 31 July 1956) is an Argentine rower. He competed in the men's coxed four event at the 1976 Summer Olympics.

References

1956 births
Living people
Argentine male rowers
Olympic rowers of Argentina
Rowers at the 1976 Summer Olympics
Place of birth missing (living people)
Pan American Games medalists in rowing
Pan American Games bronze medalists for Argentina
Rowers at the 1975 Pan American Games